The Medgar and Myrlie Evers Home National Monument, also known as Medgar Evers House, is a historic house museum at 2332 Margaret Walker Alexander Drive within the Medgar Evers Historic District in Jackson, Mississippi, United States. Built in 1956, it was the home of African American civil rights activist Medgar Evers (1925–1963) at the time of his assassination. It was designated a National Historic Landmark in 2017. The John D. Dingell, Jr. Conservation, Management, and Recreation Act, signed March 12, 2019, by President Donald Trump, authorized it as a national monument; it was established on December 10, 2020, after the National Park Service (NPS) acquired it from Tougaloo College.

Description and history
The Medgar Evers House stands in northern Jackson, in what is called the Elraine Subdivision.  This area was developed as the first planned middle-class subdivision for African-Americans in Mississippi after World War II.  The house is on the north side of Margaret Walker Alexander Drive, a few doors east of its junction with Missouri Street.  It is one of 36 similar single-story ranch-style houses built by Leroy Burnett and Walter J. Thompson.  It is a single-story wood-frame structure, set on a foundation of brick piers.  It has a broad shallow-pitch gabled roof, with a built-up covering of gravel.  The roof has extended eaves with the rafters exposed.  To the left side, the roof extends across a carport which is accessed via the original concrete driveway; the main entrance is under the carport shelter.  Part of the facade is faced in brick veneer, while the rest is finished in asbestos siding.  Interior features include a bullet hole in the wall separating the kitchen and living room.

The house was purchased new by Medgar and Myrlie Evers in 1956, and remained their home until 1963. The Everses were both active civil rights activists, and had for some time been specific targets of racist violence. They chose this house in part for features that improved its security: it was not on a corner lot, and its entrance under the carport provided better cover than a front door would. On May 28, 1963, a Molotov cocktail was thrown onto the carport. On June 11, 1963, Evers attended a meeting of civil rights groups in Jackson to formulate a response to actions taken by George Wallace, then Governor of Alabama, to prevent African-Americans from enrolling at the University of Alabama. The bullet passed through the house's picture window, and through the wall between the living room and kitchen before coming to rest. Evers died early the next morning.

Myrlie Evers moved to California in 1964, continuing the civil rights crusade.  She maintained ownership of the house for thirty years, using it as a rental property.  She donated the property to Tougaloo College in 1993.  The house underwent repairs and stabilization in 1995–96, and was restored to its appearance during the Evers residency in 2013.

See also

List of National Historic Landmarks in Mississippi
National Register of Historic Places listings in Hinds County, Mississippi
 Birmingham Civil Rights National Monument
 Freedom Riders National Monument
 Civil Rights Memorial, Montgomery, Alabama
 Civil rights movement in popular culture
 List of national monuments of the United States

References

External links

Official National Park Service site

2019 establishments in Mississippi
Civil rights movement
Historic district contributing properties in Mississippi
Historic house museums in Mississippi
Houses completed in 1956
Houses in Jackson, Mississippi
Houses on the National Register of Historic Places in Mississippi
National Historic Landmarks in Mississippi
National Register of Historic Places in Hinds County, Mississippi
Protected areas established in 2019
Tougaloo College
Monuments and memorials of the civil rights movement
Assassination sites
African-American historic house museums